KWYN-FM 92.5 FM is a radio station licensed to Wynne, Arkansas.  The station broadcasts a country music format and is owned by East Arkansas Broadcasters, Inc.

References

External links
Country 92.5 Facebook

WYN-FM
Country radio stations in the United States
Cross County, Arkansas